The 2010–11 Mountain West Conference men's basketball season was the 12th season of Mountain West Conference basketball.  This was the final season for the two Utah schools in the conference. BYU became a member of the West Coast Conference in most sports, including basketball, while its football program became independent. Utah joined the Pacific-10 Conference, which changed its name to the Pac-12 with Colorado also joining from the Big 12 Conference. The Mountain West welcomed new members as well, with Boise State joining in 2011 and Fresno State and Nevada following in 2012. The Brigham Young University Cougars and San Diego State men's basketball teams ended the regular season as co-champions. San Diego State earned the conference's automatic bid to the NCAA tournament by defeating BYU in the conference tournament. BYU and UNLV secured at-large bids into the tournament. Both BYU and SDSU reached the Sweet Sixteen round but were also eliminated in that round.

Preseason 
The Mountain West Conference held its pre-season media day on October 12, 2010 at the MountainWest Sports Network studios in Denver, Colorado.

Mountain West Media Poll

awards 

Preseason All-MWC team
Jimmer Fredette, BYU
Dairese Gary, New Mexico
Kawhi Leonard, San Diego State
Malcolm Thomas, San Diego State
Tre'Von Willis, UNLV

Preseason Player of the Year 
Jimmer Fredette, BYU

Preseason Newcomer of the Year
Drew Gordon, Jr., New Mexico

Preseason Freshman of the Year
Kyle Collinsworth, BYU

Postseason All-MWC team
Jimmer Fredette, BYU
Andy Ogide, Colorado State
Dairese Gary, New Mexico
D. J. Gay, San Diego State
Kawhi Leonard, San Diego State

Player of the year
Jimmer Fredette, BYU

Newcomer of the Year
Drew Gordon Jr., New Mexico

Freshman of the Year
Kendall Williams, New Mexico

Regular season

Rankings

Weekly awards
MWC Player of the Week
Throughout the conference season, the MWC offices named one player of the week.

Post season berths
A record tying 6 teams received post season berths. San Diego State was the conference's automatic qualifier to the 2011 NCAA Men's Division I Basketball Tournament and were joined by BYU and UNLV as at-large selections. SDSU was given a second seed in the Western regional while BYU was a third seed. Colorado State and New Mexico went to the National Invitation Tournament. In addition, Air Force received an invitation to compete in the CollegeInsider.com Postseason Tournament.

References